Jay Robert Pritzker (born January 19, 1965) is an American billionaire businessman, philanthropist, and politician serving as the 43rd governor of Illinois since 2019. A member of the wealthy Pritzker family, which owns the worldwide hotel chain Hyatt, Pritzker is based in Chicago and has started several venture capital and investment startups like the Pritzker Group, where he is a managing partner. His estimated personal net worth is $3.6 billion.

Pritzker has been a longtime financial supporter and active member of the Democratic Party. He became the Democratic nominee for governor of Illinois in the 2018 gubernatorial election after winning a crowded primary election. He defeated Republican incumbent Bruce Rauner in the general election on November 6, 2018, and took office on January 14, 2019. Pritzker was reelected in 2022.

Early life, family, and education
Pritzker was born and raised in Atherton, California, a member of the Pritzker family, a Jewish family prominent in business and philanthropy during the late 20th century. The Pritzkers have consistently been near the top of the Forbes "America's Richest Families" list since its 1982 inception. One of three children of Sue (née Sandel) and Donald Pritzker, his elder siblings are Penny Pritzker, former United States Secretary of Commerce, and Anthony Pritzker. Pritzker is named after both of his father's brothers, Jay and Bob. His grandfather Abe Pritzker was a business lawyer. Pritzker has said that certain overseas trusts, for which he was the designated beneficiary, were set up by his grandfather and used only for charitable contributions, without any personal benefit to him.

Pritzker attended Milton Academy, a boarding school in Milton, Massachusetts, and graduated from Duke University with a Bachelor of Arts in political science. In 1993, he earned his Juris Doctor from Northwestern University Pritzker School of Law. He is an attorney and a member of the Illinois State Bar Association and the Chicago Bar Association.

Business career
Pritzker served as chairman of ChicagoNEXT, Chicago Mayor Rahm Emanuel's council on innovation and technology, and he founded 1871, a nonprofit digital start-up incubator (named for the year of the Great Chicago Fire). He played an important role in the creation of the Illinois Venture Capital Association and the Chicagoland Entrepreneurial Center. He also co-founded Chicago Ventures and funded the start-up of Techstars Chicago and Built in Chicago.

With his brother Tony, Pritzker co-founded Pritzker Group Private Capital, which owns and operates middle-market companies. The group includes a growing family of companies including pallet rental leader PECO Pallet and medical device maker Clinical Innovations. In 2008, the Chicagoland Chamber of Commerce gave Pritzker its Entrepreneurial Champion Award for his efforts to promote economic development and job creation.

Early political career
In 1998, Pritzker ran for the U.S. House of Representatives in Illinois's 9th congressional district, spending $500,000 from his personal fortune on television ads in the Chicago market. He finished third among five candidates in the Democratic primary, with 20.48% of the vote to then State Representative Jan Schakowsky's 45.14% and State Senator Howard W. Carroll's 34.40%.

Pritzker founded Democratic Leadership for the 21st Century, a national organization dedicated to attracting voters under the age of 40 to the Democratic Party. He also served on the Washington, D.C., legislative staffs of U.S. Senator Terry Sanford, U.S. Senator Alan J. Dixon, and U.S. Representative Tom Lantos, for whom he handled multiple domestic and international issues.

In the 2008 presidential election, Pritzker served as national co-chairman of Hillary Clinton's campaign. He was a delegate to the 2008 Democratic National Convention and the 2016 Democratic National Convention. He supported Barack Obama in the 2008 general election and helped bring the Clinton and Obama campaigns in Illinois together.

Rod Blagojevich FBI wiretap
In May 2017, the Chicago Tribune published an 11-minute FBI wiretap of Pritzker and then-Illinois Governor Rod Blagojevich in 2008 discussing campaign contributions and options for Pritzker to be appointed to statewide office. At the time, Pritzker was described as a "businessman with political ambitions". On the tapes, Blagojevich asked Pritzker if he would like to be appointed state treasurer, to which Pritzker, who has a background in finance, responded, "Yeah, that's the one I would want." Pritzker's general election opponent GOP Governor Bruce Rauner and Pritzker's Democratic primary opponents took issue with his conduct. Pritzker responded to the allegations: "I've not been accused of any wrongdoing. I have not done anything wrong." Law enforcement made no allegations of wrongdoing against Pritzker, and he has said: "over decades of my life, I have been doing public service, and the opportunity to continue to do public service as treasurer of the state was something that had been brought up, and so there was a conversation about that."

Pritzker later apologized for a number of controversial and incendiary comments he made in that conversation. He and Blagojevich discussed filling Barack Obama's U.S. Senate seat, with Pritzker saying that appointing then-Secretary of State Jesse White would "cover you on the African-American thing" and that he was the "least offensive" candidate.

Governor of Illinois

Elections

2018

On April 6, 2017, Pritzker announced his candidacy for the Democratic nomination for governor of Illinois. He was endorsed by Illinois Secretary of State Jesse White, Illinois Congressman Luis Gutiérrez, former Illinois Congressman Glenn Poshard, more than a dozen members of the Illinois General Assembly, 21 local labor unions, and the Illinois AFL–CIO.

On August 10, 2017, Pritzker announced that his running mate would be freshman State Representative and fellow Chicago resident Juliana Stratton. By December 2017, Pritzker had spent $42million of his own money on his campaign, without significant fundraising from any other source. On March 20, 2018, he won the primary, handily beating each of his opponents by more than 20%. In the November general election, Pritzker defeated incumbent Republican governor Bruce Rauner with 54% of the vote to Rauner's 39%. Pritzker was well ahead of Rauner in most polls from the summer of 2018 onward, and won by the largest margin in a gubernatorial race since 1994.

Pritzker spent $171.5 million of his own money on his campaign, primarily on digital outreach, television advertising, and staff.

2022

Pritzker ran for reelection in the 2022 Illinois gubernatorial election, with Stratton once again as his running mate. He won the June 28 Democratic primary and faced Republican nominee Darren Bailey in the general election. He won reelection to a second term.

Tenure
Pritzker was inaugurated as the 43rd governor on January 14, 2019. He began his second term in office on January 9, 2023.

2019–20 fiscal year
On June 5, 2019, Pritzker signed a bipartisan $40 billion balanced budget for the 2019–20 fiscal year. The budget included, among many other things, $29 million in additional funding for efforts to encourage participation in the U.S. Census. Public spending increases were paid for by tax increases. A separate bill Pritzker signed imposed sales taxes on online retailers, a tax on insurance companies, and decoupled the Illinois state income tax from a federal tax cut for companies that bring their foreign profits to the U.S. The budget neglected any potential revenue that might be collected from the legalization of recreational marijuana. In addition, people who owed taxes from between June 30, 2011, and July 1, 2018, were able to take advantage of a "tax amnesty" program that allowed them to pay without penalty. The governor's office had expected a $150 million surplus, which it planned to use to pay down the state's $6 billion backlog of unpaid bills.

Abortion legislation
In June 2019, Pritzker signed into law Senate Bill 25, or the Reproductive Health Act. The act repealed the Illinois Abortion Law of 1975, which penalized doctors for performing abortions considered "unnecessary", and the "Partial-Birth Abortion Ban Act". This new bill ensured the "fundamental right to make autonomous decisions about one's own reproductive health", specifically the right to choose whether to carry a pregnancy to term or to terminate it, and denies a zygote, an embryo, or a fetus "independent rights under the law" of the State of Illinois. Pritzker encouraged states that have passed restrictions on abortion to reconsider their positions and added that women from other states can seek refuge in his.

Cannabis
On May 31, 2019, the Illinois General Assembly passed the Illinois Cannabis Regulation and Tax Act legalizing and regulating the production, consumption, and sale of adult-use cannabis. On June 25, 2019, Pritzker signed the legislation into law, which went into effect on January 1, 2020. Illinois was the 11th U.S. state to legalize recreational use of marijuana. Criminal records of individuals caught possessing less than 30 grams were cleared. Tax revenue collected from marijuana sales is used to invest in impoverished communities affected by the War on Drugs and in drug rehabilitation programs. After the first month of legalization, marijuana sales generated approximately $10.4 million in tax revenue. By July 2020, it had generated over $52 million.

On December 31, 2019, Pritzker pardoned approximately 11,000 people for low-level marijuana convictions.

Child welfare and education

In the balanced budget for the 2019–20 fiscal year, worth $40 billion, the State of Illinois authorized more spending on education, including grade schools, community colleges, and state universities. Funding for grade schools rose by nearly $379 million, more than the $29 million required by the new state funding for education formula passed the previous year. Funding for community colleges increased by $14 million, for public universities by $53 million. Grants for low-income students received a $50 million bump. The Illinois Department of Children and Family Services, facing financial pressure, received $80 million for hiring new staff and improving services.

On top of that, the Rebuild Illinois capital plan spent some $3.2 billion for public colleges and universities over six years. $78 million of that money was allocated to emergency repairs and delayed maintenance. For years, public institutions of higher learning in Illinois had struggled financially and lobbied for increased funding without much success. Budget cuts and ballooning costs had driven Illinois residents out of state. Tuition fees, room and board had doubled in virtually every state college or university since the 2003–04 academic year. According to the Illinois Board of Higher Education, in 2017, 48.4% of Illinois public high school graduates went on to attend out-of-state institutions. That number was 46.6% in 2016, and 29.3% in 2002. Moreover, data show that Illinoisans chose not just colleges and universities from nearby states such as Iowa and Indiana, but also as far away as Alabama and Utah, lured by financial aid and scholarship packages.

Below is a sample of state colleges and universities in line for additional funding.

In addition, community colleges statewide received a total of $1,032,800,000 while private colleges and universities got $400 million for capital projects. AIM High, a merit-based scholarship program for Illinoisans, saw its funding rise to $35 million, up $10 million.

Pritzker created the College Student Credit Card Marketing and Debt Task Force (House Bill 1581), whose task it is to look for ways to help students reduce their credit card debts after graduating from an institution of higher education in the state. The task force was to report its findings to the General Assembly by December 4, 2019.

Pritzker created a job training program for community colleges funded based on the percentage of low-income students attending. It launched in 2020.

In July 2019, Pritzker signed House Bill 2512. Approved unanimously by both chambers of the Illinois General Assembly, it requires state universities to report what students pay in tuition fees to the Illinois Board of Higher Education. This is intended to increase transparency in the costs of higher education.

Climate change
Pritzker joined the U.S. Climate Alliance, which was made after President Donald Trump withdrew the U.S. from the Paris Agreement.

COVID-19 pandemic

During the COVID-19 pandemic, Pritzker took several measures to mitigate the pandemic in Illinois.

On March 13, 2020, Pritzker declared that public and private schools in Illinois would be closed from March 17 through March 31. On March 15, he announced that all bars and restaurants must close until March 30. Restaurant businesses with delivery and takeout options would still be able to serve.

On March 16, 2020, Pritzker issued an executive order limiting permitted crowd sizes to 50 people. Despite pressure from Chicago election officials, he refused to postpone the state's March 17 primary elections, since it was not something that he had the authority to do.

On March 20, 2020, Pritzker issued a stay-at-home order to take effect the next day. Under this order, all non-essential businesses were required to close while essential businesses such as grocery stores, gas stations, hospitals, pharmacies remained open. The order originally ended on April 8. The state government coordinated a public health response. The State of Illinois worked with the U.S. Department of Health and Human Services, Wal-Mart, and Walgreens to provide testing sites in Illinois's hardest-hit communities. By June, amid unrest by some municipalities unhappy with Pritzker's lockdown orders, Mayor Keith Pekau of Orland Park, a suburb southwest of Chicago, and a local restaurateur sued Pritzker in federal court, alleging that the lockdown orders violated state law and the state constitution. U.S. District Judge Andrea Wood ruled against the plaintiffs, allowing the lockdown orders to stay in place. In her ruling, she cited Jacobson v Massachusetts, a 1905 U.S. Supreme Court case that upheld the authority of U.S. states to compel people to get vaccinations.

On March 25, 2020, Pritzker announced the extension of Illinois's tax filing deadline from April 15 to July 15. He also announced three new emergency assistance programs that allowed small businesses to access more than $90 million in aid.

On April 23, 2020, Pritzker extended the stay-at-home order through May 29 with some modifications. Churches were prohibited from holding meetings that had more than 10 people in attendance. Some churches defied Pritzker, held meetings, and filed federal lawsuits.

On May 1, 2020, Pritzker enacted a statewide mask mandate.

On May 5, 2020, Pritzker announced his reopening plan, "Restore Illinois". The plan had five phases and split the state's 11 existing Emergency Medical Services Regions into four reopening regions. The regions could reopen independently of one another. All regions were then in Phase Two, which allowed retail curbside pickup and delivery along with outdoor activities such as golf, boating, and fishing. Phase Three would allow manufacturing, offices, retail, barbershops, and salons to reopen with capacity limits, along with gatherings of fewer than 10 people. In Phase 4, gatherings of up to 50 people were allowed, restaurants and bars could reopen, travel resumed, and child care and schools reopened under guidance from the IDPH. In Phase 5, the economy fully reopened. Conventions, festivals and large events were permitted, and all businesses, schools, and places of recreation could be fully open.

On July 15, 2020, Pritzker announced a new COVID-19 mitigation plan in the event of a resurgence of COVID-19. The metrics that would be used to determine whether COVID-19's spread in a region required additional mitigations were a sustained increase in 7-day rolling average (7 out of 10 days) in the positivity rate and one of the following: a sustained 7-day increase in hospital admissions for a COVID-19 or the reduction in hospital capacity. Another metric was three consecutive days averaging greater than or equal to 8% positivity rate.

On December 4, 2020, Pritzker announced that Illinois would receive 109,000 initial doses of Pfizer's COVID-19 vaccine once the U.S. Food and Drug Administration approved the vaccine.

On February 26, 2021, Pritzker, Cook County Board President Toni Preckwinkle, Chicago Mayor Lori Lightfoot, U.S. Senators Dick Durbin and Tammy Duckworth, and the Biden administration announced that eligible Illinoisans could get vaccinated starting March 10 at a new mass vaccination site at the United Center.

On July 29, 2021, Pritzker announced that everyone who enters a state building was required to wear a face mask regardless of vaccination status.

On August 5, 2021, Pritzker announced that face masks must be worn at all times while inside P-12 schools, daycares, and long-term care facilities regardless of vaccination status. He also announced that face masks were required for all P-12 indoor sports, and that all state employees in congregate facilities must be vaccinated by October 4.

On August 26, 2021, Pritzker announced that a statewide indoor mask mandate would be reimposed to handle the surge caused by the Delta variant beginning on August 30. He also announced a vaccine mandate for all education employees in P-12 and higher education statewide and for all higher education students and healthcare workers. Pritzker announced that anyone who did not get a COVID-19 vaccine by September 5 would have to do weekly COVID testing.

On September 19, 2021, Pritzker began imposing a COVID-19 vaccine mandate for college students, educators and most health care workers.

On February 28, 2022, Pritzker lifted most of Illinois's COVID-19 restrictions, including the statewide mask mandate, which came just a few days after the CDC issued new, more relaxed masking guidance.

On July 14, 2022, Pritzker announced the lifting of the COVID-19 vaccine mandate for college students that initially went into effect on September 19, 2021.

Criminal justice and law enforcement
On April 1, 2019, Pritzker created Illinois's Youth Parole system.

Pritzker signed into law the Senate Bill 1890, whose goal is to crack down on human trafficking. It requires hospitality business owners to train their employees to recognize victims of trafficking and to teach them the protocols of reporting to authorities. It also establishes penalties for human trafficking, including a fine of up to $100,000 and a Class 1 Felony charge.

While serving in the Illinois Senate, Barack Obama sponsored an initiative that would collect data on traffic stops. This was codified when Pritzker signed House Bill 1613 into law. It creates a task force to collect and analyze data on traffic stops to address racial disparities. The task force was to report to the governor and the General Assembly by March 1, 2022, and every three years thereafter.

According to the governor's office, the 2019–20 budget funded two classes of Illinois State Police cadets.

In July 2019, Pritzker signed a bill that increases penalties for drivers who got involved in a road incident with injuries while texting. Under this bill, a person who causes serious injuries due to driving while texting could be fined at least $1,000 and have their driver's license suspended for a year. The law took effect immediately. In the same month, he signed House Bill 2045, ending the practice of collecting a $5 copay for offsite medical and dental treatments from people detained at a juvenile correction facility. This took effect in January 2020.

On December 31, 2020, Pritzker announced the expungement of approximately 500,000 non-felony cannabis-related arrest records.

On February 22, 2021, Pritzker signed a criminal justice reform bill that, among other things, makes Illinois the first U.S. state to eliminate cash bail. The provision was scheduled to into effect in January 2023, but is on hold, pending the Illinois Supreme Court's review.

Gambling
To help pay for his 2019 capital spending bill, Pritzker expanded gambling, allowing more casinos and legalized sports betting. This did not mean new casinos could be built and sports betting could begin right away: granting licenses for such activities is the job of the Illinois Gaming Board, and the process is a complex one, lasting several months or more and involving extensive criminal background checks, among other requirements. According to the governor's office, gambling will bring an additional $350 million in revenue each year. This gambling expansion bill extends to Chicago, something the city wanted. Mayor Lightfoot emphasized economic development in the city's South and West sides during her campaign. She has argued that a new casino, privately owned, and associated hospitality and entertainment venues will bring money into the city.

On May 5, 2022, Lightfoot announced that she had selected Bally's Corporation's bid to construct a casino resort near the Chicago River.

Gun control
On January 17, 2019, Pritzker signed a bill requiring state certification for gun dealers, which passed during the tenure of his predecessor, Bruce Rauner. It also requires gun dealers to ensure the physical security of their stores, to keep a detailed list of items on sale, and employees of such stores to undergo annual training. These requirements come on top of the mandatory federal license issued by the Bureau of Alcohol, Tobacco, Firearms and Explosives. Proponents say Senate Bill 337 prevents guns from falling "into the wrong hands" while opponents argue it creates additional bureaucracy, imposes a financial burden on gun business owners, and will neither enhance public safety nor reduce crime. The Illinois State Rifle Association argued that the bill violates the Second Amendment to the United States Constitution because it interferes with the right to bear arms, and filed a lawsuit alongside eight gun dealers.

On May 25, 2022, in response to Texas governor Greg Abbott's comments in the aftermath of the Robb Elementary School shooting that Chicago, Los Angeles, and New York City crime proves harsher gun laws are not a solution, Pritzker said that a "majority of guns used in Chicago shootings come from states with lax gun laws". Other city and state officials, including Mayor Lightfoot and Attorney General Kwame Raoul, also criticized Abbott's comments. UIC professor of political science Alexandra Filindra, described as an expert on gun policy, said preventing gun violence must be done on the federal level, that gun rights can coexist with restrictive laws, and that acquisition of weapons in general became easier after the 2008 U.S. Supreme Court decision District of Columbia v. Heller.

On January 11, 2023, Pritzker signed a ban on assault weapons and high-capacity magazines. He said of the legislation, "With this legislation we are delivering on the promises Democrats have made and, together, we are making Illinois's gun laws a model for the nation." The new law took effect immediately, with approximately 2.5 million Illinois gun owners affected. Gun rights organizations pledged to challenge the law in court, saying, "Almost the entire bill is a constitutional issue", according to the Illinois State Rifle Association. An Effingham County judge issued a temporary injunction preventing implementation of the law on January 20, 2023. Lawsuits are also pending in federal court and in Crawford County.

Health care
In 2019, Pritzker approved a tax on private insurance that will go into the state's Medicaid program.

Immigration
On January 24, 2019, Pritzker signed an executive order expanding access to Illinois welcome centers for immigrants and refugees. Welcome centers help guide immigrants on a path to citizenship and refugees with access to health care, education, jobs, and legal services.

On June 21, 2019, Pritzker signed a bill banning the operation of private immigration detention centers in Illinois. Another bill forbids state and local police to cooperate with U.S. Immigration Customs and Enforcement (ICE) to deport illegal immigrants. College students who are undocumented immigrants or identify as transgender may apply for state financial aid for college. (Federal aid requires proof of citizenship and those who were assigned male at birth to register for the draft.)

Pritzker erased the drug conviction of an Army veteran in August 2019. Miguel Perez Jr. suffered a brain injury while serving in Afghanistan and was diagnosed with post-traumatic stress disorder. He was deported to Mexico in 2018 after spending seven years in prison. He had pleaded guilty to a drug crime and held a green card as a permanent U.S. resident. Perez's supporters hope the pardon will help him return to the U.S.

Infrastructure

In late June 2019, Pritzker signed the bipartisan capital bill named Rebuild Illinois, worth $45 billion to be spent in six years and estimated to create 540,000 jobs. It was the first capital spending bill in Illinois in 10 years. The plan includes $33.2 billion for transportation projects, including $25 billion for road upgrades, with local governments deciding which roads they want to prioritize, $3.5 billion for public and private schools and universities, $1 billion for environmental protection, $420 million for expanding broadband Internet service to rural Illinois, $465 million for health care and human services facilities, and $1.8 billion for libraries, museums, and minority-owned businesses. Financing for this plan will come from multiple sources. The gas tax was set to match inflation since the last gas tax increase in 1990, increasing from 19 cents per gallon to 38 cents; the special fuel tax on diesel, liquefied natural gas, and propane increased to 7.5 cents per gallon. Fuel taxes will be indexed to inflation. Vehicle registration fees increased by $50. The state's bonding authority will increase from $22.6 billion to $60.8 billion. Newly authorized casinos are expected to create thousands of jobs and deliver hundreds of millions of dollars in tax revenue for construction projects. Cook County municipalities may raise their own gas taxes by up to three cents per gallon, though Chicago Mayor Lori Lightfoot said she opposed raising the gas tax in her city and increasing Chicago Transit Authority fares. The capital bill also stipulates the creation of an apprenticeship program in the construction industry to provide part of the labor force necessary.

Transportation spending includes money for mass transit and pedestrian paths, with hundreds of millions going to projects involving Chicago. Some major projects are the reconstruction and capacity enhancement of the Kennedy Expressway ($561 million), expanding an Amtrak service between Chicago and Rockford ($275 million), and upgrades for the Pace suburban bus service ($220 million). Millions of dollars will be spent on improving the Chicago–St. Louis higher-speed railway, and moving passenger and rail traffic in Springfield to one set of tracks, eliminating a physical barrier.

As justification for the multi-billion-dollar spending bill and the accompanying tax hikes, Pritzker said that Illinois had not had a major infrastructure plan for two decades and asserted that improved infrastructure would help drivers on repairs.

In June 2019, Pritzker deployed 200 Illinois National Guardsmen to combat flooding across central and southern Illinois. The troops were tasked with sandbagging, protecting levees and keeping evacuation routes open. In August 2019, he officially requested a federal disaster declaration for 32 Illinois counties due to flooding since February 2019. The request came after the state's disaster assessment was concluded.

Labor
On February 19, 2019, Pritzker signed into law a bill that raises the state minimum wage to $15 an hour by 2025, making Illinois the fifth state in the nation and first state in the Midwest to do so. The bill includes a tax credit for small businesses to help them deal with higher costs of labor and maintains the ability of restaurant owners to count tips toward pay.

On April 12, 2019, Pritzker signed the Collective Bargaining Freedom Act, which protects the right of employers, employees, and their labor organizations to collectively bargain, ensuring that Illinois complies with the National Labor Relations Act. On May 17, 2019, Pritzker signed legislation to help workers exposed to toxic substances.

Pritzker signed the House 2028 bill, which passed both the Senate and House of Illinois unanimously. This bill doubles the compensation rate for families of officers of the law and firefighters killed in the line of duty from $10,000 to $20,000.

177 members of the Illinois legislature will receive $1,600 each in cost-of-living increases.

Pritzker refused to take on the City of Chicago's pension liabilities, believing that would jeopardize Illinois's credit rating. Moody's raised it to one level above "junk" after Illinois passed a balanced budget in 2019. But Pritzker did not reject the possibility of allowing Chicago to pool its pension funds with other parts of the state, and created a task force to find ways to tackle municipalities' ballooning pension debts.

LGBT rights
In June 2019, Pritzker signed an executive order requiring schools across the state to be "affirming and inclusive" of transgender and non-binary students. He also asked the State Board of Education to take a lead on LGBT rights by making relevant resources easily accessible.

Taxation

On the same day as the 2019–20 state budget, Pritzker also signed the "Fair Tax" law, which offered a constitutional amendment to voters in the November 2020 election to replace Illinois's flat tax with graduated rates. He promised that income taxes would not increase for Illinoisans who make $250,000 a year or less, who are 97% of the state's wage earners. Pritzker and his supporters said changing income tax laws was the first step toward comprehensive state tax reform. The proposed graduated income tax rates were:

According to the governor's office, under this proposal, families and couples would see tax cuts across the board. For example, a family of four making $61,000 a year would pay $41 less in income tax before any other tax exemptions or deductions. Moreover, there would be a tax credit of up to $100 per child for individuals making less than $80,000 and joint filers earning under $100,000. The corporate tax rate would rise from 7% to 7.95%, equal to the highest personal rate. In addition, Pritzker wanted to increase the property tax credit to 6% from 5%.

Pritzker donated over $55 million to "Vote Yes for Fairness", a committee that supported the tax change. The tax change set up a fight between Pritzker and Ken Griffin, who donated over $50 million to a group opposing it. Griffin called Pritzker "spineless", accusing him of trying "to sell a trick disguised as a solution", and pointed to Pritzker's offshore trusts and personal tax avoidance schemes as hypocritical.

Pritzker claimed that his income tax proposal would bring $3.4 billion in tax revenue. As of 2019, Illinois had $8.5 billion of unpaid bills and $134 billion of pension liabilities.

The gas tax that funds the 2019 infrastructure plan, 38 cents per gallon and indexed to inflation, took effect on July 1, 2019. As of 2019, Illinois had one of the highest fuel taxes in the U.S.

Tobacco
On April 7, 2019, Pritzker made Illinois the first state in the Midwest to adopt Tobacco 21.

As part of his plan to fund capital projects, Pritzker raised the sales tax on cigarettes by $1.

Voting rights 
In June 2020, Pritzker signed legislation to expand voting by making Election Day a state holiday.

Welfare 
The 2019–20 budget spent $230 million on a new Quincy Veterans Home, and $21 million on the Chicago Veterans Home.

In July 2019, Pritzker signed House Bill 3343, creating a food program for the elderly, the disabled, and the homeless. Such individuals may collect their benefits from a private business that has a contract with the Illinois Department of Human Services (IDHS) to provide meals with discounts. This is the state implementation of the federal Supplemental Nutrition Assistance Program (SNAP). The IDHS was to initiate this program no later than January 1, 2020.

Approval rating

Political positions

Abortion
Pritzker is pro-choice and a vocal supporter of reproductive rights. During the 2018 gubernatorial Democratic primaries, Planned Parenthood supported Pritzker, along with Kennedy and Biss.

On January 22, 2019, Pritzker signed an executive order giving state employees and women covered under Illinois state health insurance expanded reproductive coverage, including abortion. Planned Parenthood officials praised the move and attended the signing event.

Environmental issues
On January 23, 2019, Pritzker committed Illinois to the U.S. Climate Alliance, which aims to reduce the state's greenhouse gas emissions by over 26% by 2025. In 2017, it was revealed that both Pritzker and his 2018 gubernatorial primary opponent Christopher G. Kennedy had stock holdings in ExxonMobil, Chevron Corporation, Occidental Petroleum, and ConocoPhillips, raising questions about whether either of them had genuine commitments to reducing climate change.

Gun control
Pritzker supports bans on various types of firearms and magazines. He also supports strict and universal firearm registration.

Immigration
Pritzker supports Syrian refugees, and criticized the Trump administration and Rauner for "turning a blind eye on them". He also supports enhancing funding for immigrant and refugee services, increasing health care options for undocumented immigrants, improving the U-Visa certification process for victims of violent crimes, and providing access to financial aid for undocumented students such as DACA recipients. He has said he would sign the "Illinois Trust Act", a pro-immigration bill.

LGBT rights
Pritzker has been a longtime advocate of LGBT rights, and has actively participated in the Chicago Gay Pride Parade. As part of his 2018 gubernatorial race, he said his administration would address anti-LGBT hate crimes, expand LGBT access to health care, and oppose any anti-LGBT legislation.

Cannabis
Pritzker supports expanding the state's medical marijuana program and legalizing recreational cannabis in Illinois. In June 2019, he signed the Illinois Cannabis Regulation and Tax Act into law, which effectively legalized the possession and regulated sale of marijuana for recreational purposes starting in 2020.

Minimum wage
As a candidate for governor, Pritzker campaigned on raising the minimum wage in Illinois to $15 an hour.

Net neutrality
Pritzker supports net neutrality, and wrote on his gubernatorial campaign website: "As governor, I will ensure that all internet traffic is treated equally, so that everyone can continue to use the internet to grow their businesses, further their education, and enjoy the freedom of expression."

Philanthropy
As president of the Pritzker Family Foundation, Pritzker funds research and programs focused on children in poverty. Under the leadership of economist James Heckman, he supported the creation of the Pritzker Consortium on Early Childhood Development at the University of Chicago. With the Bill & Melinda Gates Foundation, the Buffett Early Childhood Fund, the Irving Harris Foundation, and the George Kaiser Family Foundation, the Pritzker Family Foundation is a founding supporter of the First Five Years Fund, an organization focusing nationwide attention and resources on comprehensive, quality early care and learning programs for children from birth to age five. In 2013, Pritzker teamed with Goldman Sachs to fund the first-ever social impact bond for early childhood education.

As chairman of the Illinois Holocaust Museum and Education Center, which opened in 2009, Pritzker successfully led the capital campaign and planning to build an international institution in the Midwest dedicated to teaching the lessons of the Holocaust and other genocides. He is the principal funder of Cambodia Tribunal Monitor, the most significant online source for news and commentaries on the international criminal tribunal created to bring to justice the perpetrators of Pol Pot-era acts of genocide. He chaired the Illinois Human Rights Commission, and was succeeded by former White House counsel and Federal Judge Abner J. Mikva. In 2013, Pritzker received the Survivors' Legacy Award for his leadership in the creation of the Illinois Holocaust Museum and Education Center.

In 2007, Pritzker and his wife donated $5 million to the University of South Dakota to build the Theodore R. and Karen K. Muenster University Center in honor of his wife's parents. In 2011, Milton Academy dedicated the Pritzker Science Center for which Pritzker provided the lead gift. Pritzker is a trustee and serves on the investment committee of Northwestern University. He is a member of the Board of Governors of Northwestern University School of Law. He is a member of the Economic Club of Chicago and the Commercial Club of Chicago. He joined the Duke University Board of Trustees in 2017; his term expires in 2023.

On October 22, 2015, Northwestern University School of Law announced that Pritzker and his wife, M. K. Pritzker, had made a $100 million gift to the school in honor of Pritzker's great-grandfather, Nicholas J. Pritzker. The 156-year-old school was renamed the Northwestern Pritzker School of Law.

Pritzker received the Spirit of Erikson Institute Award for his creation of the Children's Initiative.

The Better Government Association, an Illinois watchdog, has criticized Pritzker's charitable giving practices, saying he funneled the funds he gave to charity from offshore tax havens. "The result is that Pritzker's philanthropy, and any accolades that go with it, have been bankrolled with what is essentially found money. He did little to earn the proceeds and paid no taxes on the bulk of it before giving it away", the BGA wrote.

Personal life
In 1993, Pritzker married Mary Kathryn "M. K." Muenster, whom he had met in Washington, D.C., when she worked as an aide to U.S. Senator Tom Daschle. She is one of three children of Theodore and Karen Muenster. Her father unsuccessfully ran for the U.S. Senate in 1990. They live in Chicago's Gold Coast neighborhood with their two children.

The Chicago Sun-Times reported that Pritzker had purposely caused a mansion he had purchased next door to his home to become uninhabitable by removing its toilets. He then appealed his original property tax assessment because the newly built property was uninhabitable; the Cook County assessor reduced the home's value from $6.25 million to about $1.1 million, which granted Pritzker an 83% property tax reduction, equal to about $230,000 per annum. Federal prosecutors are investigating the matter.

Electoral history

See also
 Infrastructure-based development

References

External links

Governor JB Pritzker official government website
JB for Governor campaign website

|-

|-

|-

|-

1965 births
American billionaires
American people of Ukrainian-Jewish descent
Philanthropists from Illinois
American venture capitalists
Businesspeople from Chicago
Democratic Party governors of Illinois
Duke University Trinity College of Arts and Sciences alumni
Illinois lawyers
Jewish American state governors of the United States
Jewish American people in Illinois politics
Jewish American philanthropists
Living people
Northwestern University alumni
J.B.
Milton Academy alumni
American gun control activists
American LGBT rights activists
21st-century American Jews
21st-century American philanthropists